Taavi Tamminen (10 March 1889 – 19 January 1967) was a Greco-Roman wrestler from Finland. He won a silver Olympic medal in 1920, losing in the final to his clubmate Emil Väre, a world title in 1921, and a national title in 1922. After retiring from competitions he worked as a wrestling referee and masseur, attending the 1936 Summer Olympics with the Finnish team.

References

External links
 

1889 births
1967 deaths
People from Uurainen
Olympic wrestlers of Finland
Wrestlers at the 1920 Summer Olympics
Finnish male sport wrestlers
Olympic silver medalists for Finland
Olympic medalists in wrestling
Medalists at the 1920 Summer Olympics
World Wrestling Championships medalists
Sportspeople from Central Finland
19th-century Finnish people
20th-century Finnish people